Tony Russel (born Antonio Pietro Russo, and sometimes credited as Tony Russo or Tony Russell; November 23, 1925 – March 18, 2017) was an American film, stage, and television actor.  He was noted for having worked extensively in the Italian film industry in the mid-1960s, and for his work as a voice actor where he was the founder and president of the English Language Dubbers Association (ELDA) in Italy. He was one of several American actors who turned down the lead of A Fistful of Dollars.

Biography
Born in Kenosha, Wisconsin, from Italian immigrants, Russo served in the United States Army Air Forces during World War II. Russel then studied at University of Wisconsin–Madison.

After making Burt Topper's War is Hell (1963), he went to Italy first appearing in the title role of La leggenda di Fra Diavolo. He then appeared in several sword and sandal and Eurospy films, including Secret of the Sphinx (1964) and Gladiators Seven (1964). Russel played Zorro in Behind the Mask of Zorro (1965); he had originally tested for the role of Walt Disney's Zorro but lost out to Guy Williams.  Among Russel's starring roles are parts in the sci-fi epics Wild, Wild Planet (1965) and its sequel, War of the Planets filmed concurrently.

He left Italy for America in 1967, and later appeared in such films as The Hard Ride (1971) and Soul Hustler (1973).

He died on March 18, 2017, in Las Vegas, Nevada, aged 91.

Selected filmography
 Hiawatha (1952, dir. Kurt Neumann) (uncredited)
 The Silver Chalice (1954, dir. Victor Saville) as Sicarii (uncredited)
 Jump Into Hell (1955, dir. David Butler) as Radio Operator (uncredited)
 Highway Patrol (1955) as Patrolman
 Anything Goes (1958, dir. Robert Lewis) as French Sailor (uncredited)
 King Creole (1958, dir. Michael Curtiz) as Chico (uncredited)
 Don't Give Up the Ship (1959, dir. Norman Taurog) as Lieutenant, s.g. (uncredited)
 Last Train from Gun Hill (1959, dir. John Sturges) as Pinto (uncredited)
 War Is Hell (1961, dir. Burt Topper)  as Sgt. Keefer
 La leggenda di Fra Diavolo (1962, dir. Leopoldo Savona)  as Fra Diavolo
 Il terrore dei mantelli rossi (1963, dir. Mario Costa)  as Paolo
  (1963, dir. Alberto De Martino)  as Leslio
 The Thief of Damascus (1964, dir. Mario Amendola)  as Jesen
 L'ultima carica (1964, dir. Leopoldo Savona)  as Rocco Vardarelli
 Gladiators Seven (1964, dir. Alberto De Martino)  as Keros
 Hercules Against the Moon Men (1964, dir. Giacomo Gentilomo) as Tirteo (English version, voice)
 Secret of the Sphinx (1964, dir. Duccio Tessari)  as Thomas
 Behind the Mask of Zorro (1965, dir. Ricardo Blasco)  as Patriciao / Alfonso / Zorro
 Three Weeks of Love (1965, dir. William E. Brusseau) as Bud
 Wild, Wild Planet (1966, dir. Antonio Margheriti)  as Cmdr. Mike Halstead
 War of the Planets (1966, dir. Antonio Margheriti)  as Cmdr. Mike Halstead
 Target Goldseven (1966, dir. Alberto Leonardi)  as Alan Milner
 Honeymoon, Italian Style (1966, dir. Mario Amendola) as Barone Frescobaldi
 The Hard Ride (1971, dir. Burt Topper) as Big Red
 Un ufficiale non si arrende mai nemmeno di fronte all'evidenza, firmato Colonnello Buttiglione (1973, dir. Mino Guerrini)
 Soul Hustler (1973, dir. Burt Topper) as Evin Calder
 The Vegas Strip War (1984, TV Movie, dir. George Englund)  as Morgan Steinman

References

External links
 
 

1925 births
2017 deaths
American male film actors
American male stage actors
American male television actors
Male actors from Wisconsin
Actors from Kenosha, Wisconsin
United States Army Air Forces soldiers
Military personnel from Wisconsin
University of Wisconsin–Madison alumni